Lojza Baránek (born 6 February 1932 in Mukachevo)  is a Czechoslovak painter.

From 1951 to 1957 he studied at the Academy of Performing Arts in Bratislava under professor Ladislav Vychodil. After graduation, he joined the Army as an artist in the theater in Martin, and later worked at the theatre in Nitra.

Since 1934, with the exception of periods of study in the Slovak Republic, he has lived permanently in Valašské Klobouky. He founded an art course at the local music school in September 1965. His artistic work is devoted to painting, graphic art, decorative pottery and implementations of the architecture. He has exhibited in Val. Klobouky, Bratislava, Brno, Luhačovice, Zlín, Vsetín, Vizovice, Slavičín and Rožnov pod Radhoštěm.

In September 2010 he created a ceramic plaque of Gabra and Málinka, fictional characters from the books by Amálie Kutinová.

See also
List of Czech painters

References

1932 births
Living people
People from Mukachevo
Czechoslovak artists
Czechoslovak painters